Daniel Mylrea  (1757–1832) was Archdeacon of Man from 1814 to 1832.

He was Chaplain of Ramsey in 1783; Vicar of Michael in 1796; Rector of Ballaugh in 1802; and Rector of Andreas till his death in 1832. According to the inscription on his tombstone,  'He was a tender husband, an affectionate father, kind to the poor and given to hospitality.'

Notes

Archdeacons of Man
19th-century Manx Anglican priests
18th-century Manx Anglican priests
1832 deaths
1757 births